Tummon is a surname. Notable people with the surname include:

 Oliver Tummon (1884–1955), English footballer
 William Ernest Tummon (1879–1960), Canadian politician